Rustam Sarang (born 12 December 1988) is an Indian weightlifter who placed seventh in the Men's 62 kg weight class at the 2014 Commonwealth Games at Glasgow.

References 

1988 births
Living people
Indian male weightlifters
Sportspeople from Chhattisgarh
People from Raipur, Chhattisgarh
Weightlifters at the 2010 Asian Games
Weightlifters at the 2014 Commonwealth Games
Asian Games competitors for India
Commonwealth Games competitors for India
21st-century Indian people